The 2001 Players Championship was a golf tournament in Florida on the PGA Tour, held  at TPC Sawgrass in Ponte Vedra Beach, southeast of Jacksonville. It was the 28th Players Championship. 

Tiger Woods won the first of his two Players Championships, one stroke ahead of runner-up Vijay Singh. Because of bad weather, the tournament was completed on Monday, March 26. In the final pairing with 54-hole leader Jerry Kelly, Woods played the final nine holes on Monday. He had also won the previous week, at Arnold Palmer's Bay Hill Invitational 

Woods had won the previous three majors in 2000; he won the Masters Tournament two weeks later to hold all four major titles at once, the Tiger Slam, as well as this Players, the unofficial "fifth major." He won his second Players a dozen years later in 2013.

Through 2020, Woods is the only winner of the Players and Masters in the same calendar year (2001), and he was the third Players champion to win a major in the same calendar year, joining Jack Nicklaus (1978) and Hal Sutton (1983); it expanded to four with Martin Kaymer in 2014.

Defending champion Sutton finished seven strokes back, in a tie for fifth place.

Venue

Field
Fulton Allem, Robert Allenby, Stephen Ames, Billy Andrade, Stuart Appleby, Tommy Armour III, Woody Austin, Paul Azinger, Doug Barron, Notah Begay III, Thomas Bjørn, Jay Don Blake, Mark Brooks, Olin Browne, Bob Burns, Tom Byrum, Ángel Cabrera, Mark Calcavecchia, Michael Campbell, Jim Carter, Greg Chalmers, Brandel Chamblee, Stewart Cink, Michael Clark II, Darren Clarke, Russ Cochran, John Cook, Fred Couples, Ben Crenshaw, John Daly, Robert Damron, Glen Day, Chris DiMarco, Doug Dunakey, Scott Dunlap, Joe Durant, Joel Edwards, Brad Elder, Ernie Els, Bob Estes, Nick Faldo, Brad Faxon, Steve Flesch, Carlos Franco, Harrison Frazar, Robin Freeman, Ed Fryatt, Fred Funk, Jim Furyk, Sergio García, Brian Gay, Brent Geiberger, Bill Glasson, Matt Gogel, Mathew Goggin, Retief Goosen, Paul Goydos, Jimmy Green, Pádraig Harrington, Dudley Hart, J. P. Hayes, Brian Henninger, Tim Herron, Glen Hnatiuk, Scott Hoch, Bradley Hughes, John Huston, Lee Janzen, Miguel Ángel Jiménez, Brandt Jobe, Steve Jones, Pete Jordan, Jonathan Kaye, Jerry Kelly, Skip Kendall, Tom Kite, Greg Kraft, Neal Lancaster, Bernhard Langer, Franklin Langham, Paul Lawrie, Tom Lehman, Justin Leonard, J. L. Lewis, Frank Lickliter, Davis Love III, Steve Lowery, Andrew Magee, Jeff Maggert, Len Mattiace, Billy Mayfair, Blaine McCallister, Scott McCarron, Rocco Mediate, Shaun Micheel, Phil Mickelson, Larry Mize, Colin Montgomerie, Gary Nicklaus, Greg Norman, Mark O'Meara, Joe Ogilvie, José María Olazábal, Naomichi Ozaki, Jesper Parnevik, Craig Parry, Steve Pate, Carl Paulson, Dennis Paulson, Corey Pavin, David Peoples, Kenny Perry, Nick Price, Tom Purtzer, Chris Riley, Loren Roberts, Eduardo Romero, Rory Sabbatini, Tom Scherrer, Vijay Singh, Jeff Sluman, Jerry Smith, Craig Stadler, Paul Stankowski, Steve Stricker, Kevin Sutherland, Hal Sutton, Esteban Toledo, David Toms, Kirk Triplett, Bob Tway, Jean van de Velde, Scott Verplank, Grant Waite, Duffy Waldorf, Mike Weir, Lee Westwood, Mark Wiebe, Jay Williamson, Garrett Willis, Tiger Woods, Ian Woosnam

Round summaries

First round
Thursday, March 22, 2001

Source:

Second round
Friday, March 23, 2001

Source:

Third round
Saturday, March 24, 2001

Source:

Final round
Sunday, March 25, 2001
Monday, March 26, 2001

Scorecard
Final round

Cumulative tournament scores, relative to par

Source:

Quotes
"Better than most!" – Gary Koch's (NBC Sports) call as Tiger Woods sank a  putt at the par-3 17th during the third round.
"This is what it's all about. He's going to make shots like that.

References

External links
The Players Championship website
Full Leaderboard

2001
2001 in golf
2001 in American sports
2001 in sports in Florida
March 2001 sports events in the United States